Leufroyia turtaudierei is an extinct species of sea snail, a marine gastropod mollusc in the family Raphitomidae.

Description

Distribution
Fossils of this extinct marine species were found in Lower Pliocene strata in France.

References

 Ceulemans L., Van Dingenen F. & Landau B.M. (2018). The lower Pliocene gastropods of Le Pigeon Blanc (Loire- Atlantique, northwest France). Part 5 – Neogastropoda (Conoidea) and Heterobranchia (fine). Cainozoic Research. 18(2): 89-176

turtaudierei
Gastropods described in 2018